Torm may refer to:

 "Torm" (Jüri Pootsmann song), 2015
 "Torm", a song by Terminaator from Lõputu päev, 1994
 Dampskibsselskabet Torm, a Danish shipping company
 Ditlev Torm (1836-1907), Danish businessman, co-founder Dampskibsselskabet Torm

See also
 Torma (disambiguation)